The Eildon Dam is a rock and earth-fill embankment dam with a controlled spillway across the Goulburn River, is located between the regional towns of  and  within Lake Eildon National Park, in the Alpine region of Victoria, Australia. The dam's purpose is for the supply of potable water, irrigation, and the generation of hydroelectricity. The impounded reservoir is called Lake Eildon.

Location and features

Designed by the State Rivers and Water Supply Commission of Victoria, construction of the original water storage, which was known as Sugarloaf Reservoir, took place between 1915 and 1929 to provide irrigation water for what was a vast uncultivated area on Victoria's northern plains. However, this reservoir was still limited in its capacity to meet the growing demand for water in the Goulburn Valley and to protect farmers during drought years. Following a detailed feasibility study of all possible storage sites on the Goulburn River, it was decided that the existing dam site was the most suitable for construction of a larger dam. In 1951, work began to enlarge the storage to its present capacity. The enlargement was completed in 1955 and the storage was renamed Lake Eildon.

The core component materials of the wall include  of rock and earth.

Lake Eildon is connected to the metropolitan water supply of Melbourne, the state capital, via a pipeline from the Goulburn River. On average, 91% of the water from Lake Eildon goes to the Goulburn Weir and the Waranga Basin before it flows to irrigators in the Goulburn Valley system.

Power generation
Operated by AGL Energy, Eildon Hydroelectric Power Station is a hydroelectric power station that operates during the irrigation season from August to May. Its operation is mainly governed by release of water to meet irrigation demands, but it may also be operated during winter and spring when flood releases can be used to generate electricity. The power station can also be used to meet short-term emergency power needs resulting from industrial disputes or plant breakdown elsewhere in the State's power grid. Initially completed as part of the Sugarloaf Reservoir with just  of hydroelectric generating power, capacity was increased by 1957 to  through the installation of two  turbines. The first  turbine was commissioned in 1956, and a second in 1957. In addition, there are two  turbines; these were decommissioned in 1971, but recommissioned in 2001. These smaller turbines were relocated from the former Sugarloaf Power Station on the Eildon Weir, completed in 1929 and in use until work on the larger dam started in 1951. A  pondage below the dam temporarily detains water discharged from the power station and regulates releases downstream to minimise variations in flow due to intermittent power generation. In 1995 the Eildon Pondage Power Station, a small hydro-electric station with  output was installed on the pondage.

Houseboats 
As the only inland waterway where houseboats are permitted, Lake Eildon has a thriving houseboat culture with over 700 on the lake. There is a Private Harbour and a Public Harbour. Rental of houseboats is possible in the latter. Some boats are restricted to daytime operation due to lack of lighting. The Private Harbour manages the owners' houseboats with staff and facilities that cater to over 18 marinas. Both harbours provide fueling facilities.

Drought and recovery
During the drought years in Victoria in the 2000s, Lake Eildon rarely filled and the once-thriving holiday destinations around the lake were unable to attract visitors, leading to considerable economic hardship. Although water is in great demand for agriculture, careful regulation has kept outflows fairly static. During November 2006 the lake dropped to a low of only 15% from the previous year level of 48.3%. The lake reached as low as 5.3% in 2007.

After many years with below average rainfall, 2010 saw Lake Eildon receive above average rainfall and rose from 23% of capacity in May 2010 to be 82.5% as of March 2011. On the night of the 13th October 2022, Lake Eildon inflows peaked at 145,000 megalitres per day, decreasing overnight to 100,000, far above the dam's maximum outflow of 38,000 megalitres per day with the spill gates open. On the 15th October 2022, due to an abnormal amount of rain in the region, the lake filled up to 100.3% of its capacity for the first time since 1994. Because the spillway gates were raised, this raised the height of the dam allowing more water into the reservoir than is normally able.

In film
The nearby town of Bonnie Doon was the location for the holiday scenes in the movie, The Castle. Lake Eildon was also the main location used for the 1975 feature film version of The Box, as well as the 1989 direct-to-video Australian horror film Houseboat Horror.

Gallery

See also

 List of dams in Victoria
North-South Pipeline
Goulburn River
 List of power stations in Victoria (Australia)
 Eildon Pondage Power Station
 Rubicon Hydroelectric Scheme
 The Family (Australian New Age group)

References

External links
 Lake Eildon Tourism Website
 Goulburn-Murray Water - Lake Eildon
 Lake Eildon Challenge multi sports event

 

Reservoirs in Victoria (Australia)
Goulburn Broken catchment
Rivers of Hume (region)
Goulburn River
Embankment dams
Rock-filled dams
Earth-filled dams
Dams in the Murray River basin
1929 establishments in Australia
Dams completed in 1929
Hydroelectric power stations in Victoria (Australia)